Liolaemus nigriceps (black-headed lizard or black tree iguana) is a species of lizard in the family Iguanidae. It is endemic to the Atacama in Chile, and grows to roughly 2.5 inches (6.25 cm) long.

References

 World Conservation Monitoring Centre 1996.

nigriceps
Lizards of South America
Endemic fauna of Chile
Reptiles of Chile
Reptiles described in 1860